Menkaure (also Menkaura, Egyptian transliteration mn-k3w-Rˁ), was an ancient Egyptian king (pharaoh) of the fourth dynasty during the Old Kingdom, who is well known under his Hellenized names Mykerinos (by Herodotus) and Menkheres (by Manetho). According to Manetho, he was the throne successor of king Bikheris, but according to archaeological evidence, he was almost certainly the successor of Khafre. Africanus (from Syncellus) reports as rulers of the fourth dynasty Sôris, Suphis I, Suphis II, Mencherês (=Menkaure), Ratoisês, Bicheris, Sebercherês, and Thamphthis in this order. Menkaure became famous for his tomb, the Pyramid of Menkaure, at Giza and his statue triads, showing the king together with his wives Rekhetre and Khamerernebty and with various deities.

Family

Menkaure was the son of Khafre and the grandson of Khufu. A flint knife found in the mortuary temple of Menkaure mentioned a king's mother Khamerernebty I, suggesting that Khafre and this queen were the parents of Menkaure. Menkaure is thought to have had at least two wives.
 Queen Khamerernebty II is the daughter of Khamerernebty I and the mother of a king's son Khuenre. The location of Khuenre's tomb suggests that he was a son of Menkaure, making his mother the wife of this king.
 Queen Rekhetre is known to have been a daughter of Khafre and as such the most likely identity of her husband is Menkaure.

Not many children are attested for Menkaure:
 Khuenre was the son of queen Khamerernebty II. Menkaure was not succeeded by Prince Khuenre, his eldest son, who predeceased Menkaure, but rather by Shepseskaf, a younger son of this king.
 Shepseskaf was the successor to Menkaure and likely his son.
 Sekhemre is known from a statue and possibly a son of Menkaure.
 A daughter who died in early adulthood is mentioned by Herodotus. She was placed at a decorated hall of the palatial area at Sais, in a hollow gold layered wooden zoomorphic burial feature in the shape of a kneeling cow covered externally with a layer of red decoration except the neck area and the horns that were covered with adequate layers of gold.
Khentkaus I – possible Menkaure's daughter

The royal court included several of Menkaure's half brothers. His brothers Nebemakhet, Duaenre, Nikaure, and Iunmin served as viziers during the reign of their brother. His brother Sekhemkare may have been younger than he was and became vizier after the death of Menkaure.

Reign 

The length of Menkaure's reign is uncertain. The ancient historian Manetho credits him with rulership of 63 years, but this is surely an exaggeration. The Turin Canon is damaged at the spot where it should present the full sum of years, but the remains allow a reconstruction of "..?.. + 8  years of rulership". Egyptologists think that 18-year rulership was meant to be written, which is generally accepted. A contemporary workmen's graffito reports about the "year after the 11th cattle count". If the cattle count was held every second year (as was tradition at least up to king Sneferu), Menkaure might have ruled for 22 years.

In 2013, a fragment of the sphinx of Menkaure was discovered at Tel Hazor at the entrance to the city palace.

Pyramid complex

Menkaure's pyramid at Giza was called Netjer-er-Menkaure, meaning "Menkaure is Divine". This pyramid is the smallest of the three main pyramids at Giza. There are three subsidiary pyramids associated with Menkaure's pyramid. 

These other pyramids are sometimes labeled G-IIIa (East subsidiary pyramid), G-IIIb (Middle subsidiary pyramid) and G-IIIc (West subsidiary pyramid). In the chapel associated with G-IIIa a statue of a queen was found. It is possible that these pyramids were meant for the queens of Khafre. It may be that Khamerernebti II was buried in one of the pyramids.

Valley temple
The Valley temple was a mainly brick built structure that was enlarged in the fifth or sixth Dynasty. From this temple come the famous statues of Menkaure with his queen and Menkaure with several deities. A partial list includes:
 Nome triad, Hathor-Mistress-of-the-Sycomore seated, and King and Hare-nome goddess standing, greywacke, in Boston Mus. 09.200.
 Nome triad, King, Hathor-Mistress-of-the-Sycomore and Theban nome-god standing, greywacke. (Now in Cairo Mus. Ent. 40678.)
 Nome triad, King, Hathor-Mistress-of-the-Sycomore and Jackal-nome goddess standing, greywacke. (Now in Cairo Mus. Ent. 40679.)
 Nome triad, King, Hathor-Mistress-of-the-Sycomore and Bat-fetish nome -goddess standing, greywacke. (Now in Cairo Mus. Ent. 46499.)
 Nome triad, King, Hathor, and nome-god standing, greywacke. (Middle part in Boston Mus. 11.3147, head of King in Brussels, Mus. Roy. E. 3074.)
 Double-statue,’ King and wife (Khamerernebti II) standing, uninscribed, greywacke. (Now in Boston Mus. 11.1738.)
 King seated, life-size, fragmentary, alabaster. (Now in Cairo Mus. Ent. 40703.)
 King seated, lower part, inscribed seat, alabaster. (Now in Boston Mus. 09.202)

Mortuary Temple
At his mortuary temple more statues and statue fragments were found. An interesting find is a fragment of a wand from Queen Khamerernebty I. The piece is now in the Boston Museum of Fine Arts. Khamerernebti is given the title King's Mother on the fragment.

Sarcophagus

In 1837, English army officer Richard William Howard Vyse, and engineer John Shae Perring began excavations within the pyramid of Menkaure. The sarcophagus was not inscribed with hieroglyphs although it was decorated in the style of palace facade. Adjacent to the burial chamber were found wooden fragments of a coffin bearing the name of Menkaure and a partial skeleton wrapped in a coarse cloth. The sarcophagus was removed from the pyramid and was sent by ship to the British Museum in London, but the merchant ship Beatrice carrying it was lost after leaving port at Malta on October 13, 1838. The other materials were sent by a separate ship, and those materials now reside at the museum, with the remains of the wooden coffin case on display.

It is now thought that the coffin was a replacement made during the much later Saite period, nearly two millennia after the king's original interment. Radio carbon dating of the bone fragments that were found, place them at an even later date, from the Coptic period in the first centuries AD.

Records from later periods
According to Herodotus (430 BC), Menkaure was the son of Khufu (Greek Cheops), and that he alleviated the suffering his father's reign had caused the inhabitants of ancient Egypt. Herodotus adds that he suffered much misfortune: his only daughter, whose corpse was interred in a wooden bull (which Herodotus claims survived to his lifetime), died before him. Subsequently the oracle at Buto predicted he would only rule six more years.

Trivia
 Menkaure was the subject of a poem by the nineteenth century English poet Matthew Arnold, entitled "Mycerinus".
 Menkaure, using the Greek version of his name, Mencheres, is a major character in the Night Huntress series of books by Jeaniene Frost, depicted as an extremely old and powerful vampire living in modern times. He is a protagonist of one book in the series.

Gallery of images

References

External links

Menkaure and His Queen by Dr. Christopher L.C.E. Witcombe.
View photos, videos, current status and other information on the pyramid of Menkaure at Talking Pyramids

 
26th-century BC Pharaohs
Pharaohs of the Fourth Dynasty of Egypt
3rd-millennium BC births
3rd-millennium BC deaths
Khafre